Paul Jones (15 June 1878 – 27 December 1972) was an Australian politician. Born in Gaffneys Creek, Victoria, he was educated at South Melbourne College before becoming a goldminer and teacher. He also studied at the University of Melbourne for a Master of Arts degree.

In 1928, he was elected to the Australian House of Representatives in unusual circumstances.  Jones stood for the Labor Party in Indi, and was initially a heavy underdog in this strongly conservative seat.  However Country Party incumbent Robert Cook mistakenly failed to lodge his renomination papers, leaving Jones to take the seat unopposed. This is one of the few known instances in the history of the Australian Parliament that a candidate has lost his or her seat in this way.

Jones narrowly held onto the seat in 1929, seeing off a spirited challenge from Cook.  He was defeated in the United Australia Party landslide of 1931, suffering a 14-point swing.  The Labor Party has not come close to winning the seat since then, only tallying 45 percent of the two-party vote once.

Jones was elected to the Victorian Legislative Council in 1938 for Doutta Galla Province. He remained in the Council until 1958, but left the Labor Party in 1955, joining the Australian Labor Party (Anti-Communist), which later became the Democratic Labor Party.

Paul Jones died in 1972.

References

1878 births
1972 deaths
Australian Labor Party members of the Parliament of Australia
Democratic Labor Party (historical) members of the Parliament of Victoria
Members of the Australian House of Representatives for Indi
Members of the Australian House of Representatives
Members of the Victorian Legislative Council
20th-century Australian politicians
Australian Labor Party members of the Parliament of Victoria